Diane Schöler (née Rowe on 14 April 1933) is a retired table tennis player from England. In 1966 she married German table tennis player Eberhard Schöler, and since then competed for West Germany. From 1951 to 1972 she won several medals in single, double, and team events in the Table Tennis European Championships, and in the World Table Tennis Championships.

Rowe started training in table tennis aged 14, under Viktor Barna. She is left-handed and until 1951 played a defensive style, but later put more accent on attacking. In early 1966, she married Eberhard Schöler and moved to Düsseldorf, where she gave birth to a daughter. She retired from competitions in 1973 and until 1997 worked as a table tennis coach. In 1993 she received the ITTF Merit Award, and in 2001 the Dieter Mauritz Gedächtnispreis.

She also won 17 English Open titles.

Diane has a twin sister, Rosalind Rowe, who was also an international table tennis player and often played doubles together with Diane. In 1955 they published a book The twins on table tennis. Their father was former amateur footballer Vivian Rowe.

See also
 List of table tennis players
 List of World Table Tennis Championships medalists
 List of England players at the World Team Table Tennis Championships

References

English female table tennis players
1933 births
Living people